Muqarrab Khan of Golconda also known as Khan Zaman Fath Jang was the most experienced commander of Qutb Shahi Dynasty, during the reign of Abul Hasan Qutb Shah. He is known for betraying Abul Hasan Qutb Shah during Siege of Golconda. He arrested Maratha Emperor Sambhaji at Sangameshwar.

Muqarrab Khan was a political rival of Abul Hasan Qutb Shah's viziers Madanna and Akkanna. After defeat of Abul Hasan Qutb Shah by Mughals, He able to escaped from battle field by retreating into the Golconda Fort. After the Mughals captured Golconda Fort Muqarrab Khan had become the de facto ruler of Golconda.

Mughal service

Defection to the Mughal Empire
Before, Aurangzeb and his forces initiated the Siege of Golconda, Muqarrab Khan the most experienced commander in Golconda, defected to the Mughals. Muqarrab Khan and his forces proved their fighting experience and worth against the Marathas when he led a contingent that eventually captured Sambhaji, the king of the Marathas at Sangameshwar and brought him to Emperor Aurangzeb.

Capture of Sambhaji

Sambhaji Maharaj and his men were captured by Muqarrab Khan and his Mughal contingent of 25,000 soldiers. Sambhaji Maharaj was presented before the Mughal Emperor Aurangzeb. Sambhaji dared Aurangzeb in open court and flatly refused to surrender the Maratha kingdom. A panel of Qadis of the Mughal Empire indicted and sentenced Sambhaji to death. He was then brutally tortured and eventually put to death. His death was a huge loss for the Marathas as without a capable leader, they eventually lost most of their territories to the Mughals and were forced to resort to guerilla warfare to resist against the Mughal Army.

See also
Mughal Empire
Abul Hasan Qutb Shah

References

Mughal Empire